Buglossoporus magnus is a rare species of poroid fungus in the family Fomitopsidaceae. Recorded from only three locations in old growth lowland rainforest of Peninsular Malaysia, it is considered a vulnerable species by the IUCN.

He noted "I met this massive fungus but once, on a large, slowly decomposing, fallen trunk that I had often passed by in previous years." The holotype specimen was found in a forest reserve in Bukit Timah, Singapore. Although the original observation of the fungus is dated to 1940, it was not officially described as a new species until 1984.

See also
 List of fungi by conservation status
 Largest fungal fruit bodies

References

Fungi of Asia
Fomitopsidaceae
Fungi described in 1984